Brian Allen Foote (born 29 December 1948) is a British former motorcycle speedway rider.

Born in Mitcham, Foote's first experience of speedway was at Long Eaton in 1967, going on to ride in second half races at Leicester Lions in 1968, where his uncle Ron Wilson was the promoter. After a few appearances for Middlesbrough Teessiders in 1968, he rode for Canterbury Crusaders and Romford Bombers in 1969. He stayed with Romford in 1970 and also made his debut in the first division of the British League with Wembley Lions, averaging a respectable 4.8 points from two meetings. He made his first appearance for the second division representative 'Young England' team in 1970, against Czechoslovakia, going on to further appearances in 1972. In 1971 he further improved for Romford, averaging eight points per match in the second division. Progress in 1972 for West Ham Bombers and Rayleigh Rockets saw him get further division one opportunities for Leicester Lions and Ipswich Witches and in 1973 he rode in 21 league matches for Leicester, averaging just over three points. While not making the grade at the top level, he continued to score highly in the second division (later named the National League) for Rye House Rockets until his retirement in 1976.

References

1948 births
Living people
British speedway riders
English motorcycle racers
People from Mitcham
Middlesbrough Bears riders
Canterbury Crusaders riders
Romford Bombers riders
Wembley Lions riders
Rayleigh Rockets riders
Leicester Lions riders
Rye House Rockets riders
Ipswich Witches riders